Urban shrinkage can refer to:

Shrinking cities, cities facing a significant drop in population
Planned shrinkage, an urban planning philosophy to deliberately reduce city services to encourage reduced population
Shrink to survive, an urban planning response to a shrink city that converts abandoned neighborhoods into rural land